Mixed Emotions is the third studio album by American band Exile. It peaked at number 14 on the Billboard Top LPs & Tape chart in 1978.

Track listing
All songs written by James P. Pennington, except where noted.

Side one
"You Thrill Me" (Mike Chapman, Nicky Chinn) – 3:52
"Never Gonna Stop" – 5:39
"There's Been a Change" – 3:03
"You and Me" – 5:29

Side two
"Kiss You All Over" (Chapman, Chinn) – 4:54
"Ain't Got No Time" (Danny Williams) – 3:13
"Don't Do It" – 4:47
"One Step at a Time" – 3:11
"Stay with Me" – 2:57

Personnel
Exile
Jimmy Stokley – vocals
J.P. Pennington – guitars, vocals
Buzz Cornelison – keyboards, vocals
Marlon Hargis – keyboards, vocals
Sonny LeMaire – bass, vocals (on "Never Gonna Stop" and "Stay With Me")
Steve Goetzman – drums
Danny Williams – bass, backup vocals (except for "Never Gonna Stop" and "Stay With Me")

Williams completed 7 of the 9 tracks, including "Kiss You All Over", before departing from the band. Sonny LeMaire finished the remaining tracks and joined the band.

Charts

Certifications

References

1978 albums
Exile (American band) albums
Warner Records albums